Natalia Leonidovna Krachkovskaya (née Belogortseva; 24 November 1938 – 3 March 2016) was a Soviet and Russian actress, Meritorious Artist (1998). Belogortseva was born in Moscow, Soviet Union.  After graduation, she submitted documents to VGIK on the course of Vladimir Belokurov

In 1958, Natalia Belogortseva was married to sound engineer, Vladimir Krachkovskii. In marriage, their son Vasily was born (June 8, 1963). For more than 50 years of film career, Krachkovskaya starred in about 90 films. Usually she played minor, but characteristic roles. She became famous during the 1970s with roles in the movies The Twelve Chairs and Ivan Vasilievich: Back to the Future.

Natalia Krachkovskaya died on 3 March 2016 at the age of 77.

Selected filmography
During her career Krachkovskaya had appeared in more than 90 movies and TV series.

 The Tale of the Agronomist (Повесть об Агрономе, 1955) as Raechka
 In the Silence of the Steppe (В Степной Тиши, 1959) as secretary
 Russian Souvenir (Русский Сувенир, 1960) as Natasha (uncredited)
 Battle on the Way (Битва в Пути, 1961) as Verunka
 High Water (Половодье, 1962) as Klava, a milkmaid
 The Twelve Chairs (Двенадцать стульев, 1971) as Madame Gritsatsuyeva
 Nylon 100% (Нейлон 100%, 1973) as Henrietta, daughter of Konstantin
Ivan Vasilievich: Back to the Future (Иван Васильевич Меняет Профессию, 1973) as Uliana Andreevna Bunsha
Chipollino (Чипполино, 1973) as Cipolla
This Merry Planet (Эта Весёлая Планета, 1973) as Butterfly
Stories About Keshka and His Friends (Рассказы о Кешка и Его Друзьях, 1974) as Zhenya's mother
Tsarevich Prosha (Царевич Проша, 1974) as Lushenka, court lady of Tsar Yermolai
In the Country of Traps (В Стране Ловушек, 1975) as Vasilisa's mother
Step Forward (film) (Шаг Навстречу, 1975) as Claudia Simonenko, who won "Zaporozhets" ( Novel "Only 30 kopecks")
It Can't Be! (Не может быть!, 1975) as Lelik wife, shopper paintings/guest at the wedding
Two Captains (Два Капитана, 1976) as a saleswoman of pies on a skating rink
Ma-ma (1976 film) (Мама, 1976) as Bear (Romania, USSR, France)
Entertainment for Ild people (Развлечение для Старичков, 1976) as a host of the competition
Incognito from St. Petersburg (Инкогнито из Петербурга, 1977) as fat lady, a guest of the mayor
Heralds Victory (Предвещает Победу, 1978) as Vanya's wife, villager
The Investigation is Conducted by ZnaToKi. Until the Third Shot. Case No. 13 (Следствие Ведут ЗнаТоКи. До Третьего Выстрела, 1978) as Nastasya, saleswoman
Summer Tour (Летние Гастроли, 1979) as Anzhelika Vasilievna, choreographer
Foam (Пена, 1979) as Kochevryazhkin's wife
Fuss of the Fusses (Суета Свет, 1979) as Barbara
A Piece of Sky (Пощечина, 1980) as Maritza, a prostitute
Keychain With a Secret (Брелок с Секретом, 1981) as head of the hairdresser
Emelino Grief. Auto Cairy Tale (Емелино Горе. Автосказка, 1981) as Mother-in-law Emelya
Be my Husband (Будьте Моим Мужем, 1981) as a Resort theater-goer
Simply Awful! (Просто ужас!, 1982) as Raisa Nikolaevna, nurse at the veterinary clinic
Along Unknown Paths (Там, на неведомых дорожках..., 1982) as Aunt with buckets
The Pokrovsky Gate (Покровские ворота, 1982) as Olga Janovna Soyeva
Take Care of the Men! (Берегите Мужчин!, 1982) as Announcer at the local node of the research institute
Vasily Buslaev (Василий Буслаев, 1982) as Okulikha
Premonition of Love (Предчувствие Любви, 1982) as Olga's mother
Evenings on a Farm Near Dikanka (Вечера на Хуторе Близ Диканьки, 1983) as Ivan Fedorovich Shponka's aunt (Voiced by another actress)
And Life, and Tears, and Love (И Жизнь, и Слёзы, и Любовь, 1983) as Masha, nurse
I Promise to Be! (Обещаю Быть!,1983) as Representative of the patronage organization
Legend of Love (Легенда о Любви, 1984) as a woman in a caravan (USSR, India)
Instruct General Nesterov... (Поручить Генералу Нестерову, 1984) as Sofia
The Feat of Odessa (Подвиг Одессы,1985) as Lyalya Shtakman, carriage driver
Beauty Salon (Салон Красоты, 1985) as Sofya Mikhailovna Krepkosolskaya, "hostess" of the ladies' beauty salon No. 84
After the Rain, on Thursday (После Дождичка в Четверг, 1985) as second nurse
Additional Arrives on the Second Path (Дополнительный Прибывает на Второй Путь, 1986) as Saukova
The Right People (Нужные Люди, 1986) as Olya's housemate
What is Yeralash? (Что Такое Ералаш?, 1986) as Lyoli's mother
Wherever You Work... (Где бы ни Работать, 1987) as Secretary of the Director of the Research Institute
Stronger Than All Other Decrees (Сильнее Всех Иных Велений, 1987) as Merchant
The Circus has Arrived (Цирк Приехал, 1987) as Pavel Pavlovna, owner of a hardware store
A Man from the Boulevard des Capucines (Человек с бульвара Капуцинов, 1987) as Conchita, Diana Little's maid
Noble Robber Vladimir Dubrovsk (Благородный разбойник Владимир Дубровский, 1988) as guest of Troekurov
The Incident in Utinoozersk (Происшествие в Утиноозёрске, 1988) — as the widow of a journalist
One, two — Grief is not a Problem! (Раз, два — горе не беда!  1988) as a court lady
Private Detective, or Operation Cooperation (Частный детектив, или Операция «Кооперация», 1989) as airliner lady passenger
Rouen Maiden Nicknamed Pyshka (Руанская дева по прозвищу Пышка, 1989) as Burgher
Swindlers (Аферисты, 1990) as Pavlina Vasilievna (Pava)
Ravines (Овраги, 1990) as Klava's colleague
KGB Agents Also Fall in Love (Агенты КГБ Тоже Влюбляются, 1991) as Klava, masseuse
Talking Monkey (Говорящая Обезьяна, 1991) as Crocodile buyer
Don't Ask me About Anything (Не Спрашивай Меня ни о Чем, 1991) as Nurse
Once in Odessa, or How to Leave the USSR (Однажды в Одессе, или как Уехать из СССР, 1991) as Nina Finkelstein
For Whom the Prison is Crying... (По Ком Тюрьма Плачет, 1991) as Alevtina Yakovlevna, director of the artel of the deaf-and-dumb
Crazy (Чокнутые, 1991) as Eve, wife of a spy
Smuggler (Контрабандист, 1991) as Misha's mother
Wandering Stars (Блуждающие Звезды, 1991) as Hana (uncredited)
Sin (Грех, 1992) as Watchman
Ka-ka-du (Ка-ка-ду, 1992) as Petrov's wife
Three Days of August (Три Дня Августа, 1992) as woman with a child
Weather Is Good on Deribasovskaya, It Rains Again on Brighton Beach (На Дерибасовской хорошая погода, или На Брайтон-Бич опять идут дожди, 1992) as Monya's Wife
Vitka Shusher and the Car (Витька Шушера и Автомобиль, 1993) as Serafima Lvovna, physics teacher
My Family Treasure (Моя Семейная Реликвия, 1993) as Widow (Russia, USA, Belarus)
Russian Business (Русский Бизнес, 1993) as Aunt Katya, huntsman
Detective Bureau "Felix" (Сыскное Бюро «Феликс», 1993) as Leikadia Grigoryevna, employee of the detective bureau "Felix"
Master and Margarita (Мастер и Маргарита, 1994) as Navigator Georges/Sofya Petrovna, lady in Griboyedov
Russian Miracle (Русское Чудо, 1994) as Aunt Katya
Russian Account (Русский Счёт, 1994) as Klava
Red Cherry (Красная Вишня, 1995) as Aunt Tonya (Belarus, China, Russia)
Moscow Holidays (Московские Каникулы, 1995) as Administrator on duty at the hotel
Strawberry (Клубничка, 1996) as Maria Ivanovna, neighbor
Children of Monday (Дети Понедельника, 1997) as Ice cream seller
Old Songs About the Main Thing 3 (Старые Песни о Главном, 1997) as Ulyana Andreevna, Bunshi's wife
The Game of Love (Игра в Любовь, 2000) as Landlady
The Hero of Her Novel (Герой Её Романа, 2001) as Aunt Katya
The Perfect Couple (Идеальная Пара, 2001) as Administrator (episode 6 "Features of Emotional Choices")
Holiday Romance (Курортный Роман, 2001) as Raisa (episode "Enchantment")
Doctors (Медики, 2001) as Olga Ivanovna ( episode 6 "Ward No. 7")
Kyshkin House (Кышкин Дом, 2001–2003) as Thumbelina, diet specialist 
Beauty Queen, or a Very Difficult Childhood (Королева Красоты, или Очень Трудное Детство, 2002) as Borka's grandmother
The Elevator Leaves on Schedule (Лифт Уходит по Расписанию, 2002) as Vera Petrovna, Lyudmila's neighbor
Nephew, or Russian Business 2 (Племянник, или Русский Бизнес 2, 2002) as Aunt Manya, "clairvoyant healer"
Anniversary of the Prosecutor (Юбилей Прокурора, 2003) as Mother-in-law
Life Somersault (Жизнь Кувырком, 2003) as Wife of Sergei Stepanovich, "doll"
The Secret of the Pharaoh (Секрет Фараона, 2004) as Nefertiti, woman on a wheelchair
Oversized (Крупногабаритные, 2005) as Svetlana Petrovna, salesperson
Phenomenon (Феномен, 2005) as Ekaterina Moiseevna
Moscow History (Московская История, 2006) as Frida, member of the admissions committee of the Faculty of Economics

References

External links
 

1938 births
2016 deaths
Soviet film actresses
Soviet stage actresses
Soviet television actresses
Russian film actresses
Russian stage actresses
Russian television actresses
Actresses from Moscow
20th-century Russian actresses
21st-century Russian actresses
Honored Artists of the Russian Federation
Burials in Troyekurovskoye Cemetery
Russian food writers